Chenar-e Olya (also Romanized as Chenār-e ‘Olyā; also known as Chenār and Chenār-e ‘Abbās Khān) is a village in Chaharduli Rural District, in the Central District of Asadabad County, Hamadan Province, Iran. At the 2006 census, its population was 2,183, in 528 families.

The village is populated by Kurds and Turkic peoples.

References 

Populated places in Asadabad County

Kurdish settlements in Iran